Below are lists of religious converts. The term proselyte is often used as a synonym for religious converts, although historically it first referred solely to converts to Judaism.

 
Converts